BanYa (반야), sometimes spelled BANYA or Banya, was the South Korean arcade game company Andamiro's musical group responsible for creating original songs for Pump It Up. The style of its music varies greatly, from hip hop to electronic, from rock to classical crossovers.

Classical remixes are among BanYa's most popular productions. Several sonatas, symphonies and other pieces feature in different versions. Mixing violins, guitars and heavy beats, these songs draw particular attention from players and passers-by. BanYa also composes original music including trance, techno, hardcore and ambient breaks.

Beginning in Pump It Up NX, former BanYa member Yahpp became a solo artist and in turn his new music became credited to him. Starting in Pump It Up Fiesta, msgoon, another former member, did the same. All other former members, starting on NX, became credited as  "BanYa Production". For the consistency of the article, all songs by the original BanYa collective are listed here.

Song catalogue
The group's first two releases under the name of BanYa were Ignition Starts and Hypnosis, although Bee, Solitary and Final Audition had been already recorded by Yahpp as an independent artist. Up to 2004 they released 3 albums, however some nonstop remixes of several BanYa songs have also been made for Pump It Up.

On Pump It Up Exceed 2, Radezky Can Can was moved from the "K-Pop Channel" to the "BanYa Channel", even though it was made by F2 System, who worked with Andamiro to make Pump It Up Extra. Holiday, the other F2 song, has only showed up on Extra, The PREX and The PREX 2.

Pump It Up: The 1st Dance Floor

Pump It Up: The 2nd Dance Floor

Pump It Up The O.B.G: The 3rd Dance Floor

Pump It Up The O.B.G: The Season Evolution Dance Floor

Pump It Up: The Perfect Collection

Pump It Up: Extra

Pump It Up: The Rebirth

Pump It Up: The Premiere 3

Pump It Up: The PREX 3

Pump It Up: Exceed

Pump It Up: Exceed 2

Pump It Up: Zero

Pump It Up: NX

Pump It Up: NX2

Pump It Up: NX Absolute

Pump It Up: Fiesta

Pump It Up: Fiesta EX

Pump It Up: Infinity

StepManiaX

Additional songs
BanYa also released some songs on promotional CDs, which are not featured so far in any games:
 "Warm Shadow in a Stranger's Eyes"
 "Going Home"
 "Golden Tears"
 "Let Me Break it Down"

As well as Full versions of the following in-game songs:
 "Beat of the War 2" (Full version is playable on NX, NX2, NXA and Fiesta)
 "Canon-D" (its Full version is a secret remix on Exceed 2, but has yet appear on any soundtracks. It also appears in Zero's Remix Station, in NX/NX2/NXA's Special Zone, and Fiesta under Full Songs)
 "Dance With Me"
 "Emperor"
 "Final Audition" 
 "Fire" (Full version is playable on NX and NX2)
 "Get Your Groove On"
 "Hate"
 "Love is a Danger Zone 2" (Full version is playable on NX, NX2, NXA and Fiesta)
 "Maria"
 "Miss's Story"
 "Mission Possible"
 "Mr. Larpus"
 "My Way"
 "N"
 "Oh! Rosa"
 "Oy Oy Oy"
 "Point Break"
 "Pump Jump"
 "She Likes Pizza"
 "Solitary"
 "Winter"

Discography

The 1st Step to the BanYa 
This album comprised all their songs from Pump It Up: The 1st Dance Floor to The O.B.G: The Season Evolution Dance Floor, excluding Creamy Skinny and Koul, from The 2nd Dance Floor. It also included an electric guitar version of Ignition Starts instead of the original hardcore version, a version of Hate sung by Pp (the same girl who sang Pumping Up) and a completely new song, a ballad entitled "Warm Shadow in a Stranger's Eyes" (rough translation, as it's very hard to translate this title from Korean). All the songs that existed in a version longer than the one appearing in the arcade were included in their original versions, except Final Audition.

Nightmare
Midnight Blue
She Likes Pizza (Pump mix)
Close Your Eyes
Free Style
Turkey March
Pumping Up
First Love
An Interesting View
Oh! Rosa (Pump mix)
With My Lover
Betrayer (Pump mix)
Final Audition (Pump mix)
Naissance
Ignition Starts (guitar version)
Final Audition 2
Hypnosis
Mr Larpus (Pump mix)
Extravaganza
Solitary (Pump mix)
Betrayer (Original version)
Hate
Hate (Pp version)
Oh! Rosa (Original version)
She Likes Pizza (Original version)
Solitary (Original version)
Mr Larpus (Original version)
Warm Shadow in a Stranger's Eyes

Interlock 
Pump Jump
Mission Possible
My Way
The Emperor
Golden Tears
Get Your Groove On
Going Home
All I Want for X-Mas
Let Me Break It Down
Love Is A Danger Zone
Street Show Down
Will-O'-The-Wisp
Beethoven Virus
Maria
Dr. M
Point Break
Winter
Chicken Wing (Mutation)

Unfinished 
Final Audition 3 U.F
Beat of the War
Naissance 2
Csikos Post
Rolling Christmas
Hello
D Gang
Bee
Vook
Pump Me Amadeus
Get Up!!
Blazing
Set me Up
Come to Me
Miss's Story
Oy Oy Oy
N
Till the end of Time
Dance With Me
Monkey Fingers
We Will Meet Again

External links
Pump It Up official site

Interview of Yahpp (2005) to Pump Haven

Video game musicians
South Korean electronic music groups